Henry Garrett was the mayor of Corpus Christi, Texas from 2005 to 2009. He was elected April 2, 2005 with over 70% of the vote for a 2-year term. Previously, Henry Garrett served over 30 years with the Corpus Christi Police Department, retiring as the Chief of Police. He also served nine years as a city councilman.

References

External links
City of Corpus Christi

Living people
Mayors of Corpus Christi, Texas
Year of birth missing (living people)